The Redipuglia War Memorial is a World War I memorial located on the Karst Plateau near the village of Fogliano Redipuglia, in the Friuli Venezia Giulia region of northeastern Italy. It is the largest war memorial in Italy and one of the largest in the world, housing the remains of 100,187 Italian soldiers killed between 1915 and 1917 in the eleven battles fought on the Karst and Isonzo front.

The memorial 

It was designed by architect Giovanni Greppi and solemnly inaugurated on 18 September 1938 in the presence of Benito Mussolini and over 50,000 soldiers who had fought on the Isonzo front in World War I. The Colle di Sant'Elia, a hill in front of Monte Sei Busi, was already the site of the war cemetery of the Italian Third Army, which fought in this sector of the front from 1915 to 1917 (the cemetery contained the remains of over 30,000 fallen, which were transferred to the newly built war memorial).

The shrine, built on the side of the hill, consists of 22 horizontal platforms of stone, arrayed in step-like progression, hosting the remains of 39,857 identified soldiers, arranged in alphabetic order. The top frieze of each platforms, above the name plaques, reads repetitively Presente (Present). Above the last step, a votive chapel is lined by two large mass graves holding the remains of 60,330 unknown soldiers. The chapel and two adjacent rooms contain personal belongings of Italian and Austro-Hungarian soldiers. At the base of the memorial, six sepulchres contain the remains of Prince Emanuele Filiberto, Duke of Aosta (the commander of the Third Army, who died in 1931 and asked to be buried among his men) and five generals killed in action. Leading up the monument is the Via Eroica ("heroic path"), is flanked by 38 bronze plaques with the names of 38 locations of the Karst plateau where the fighting was bloodiest. The fallen buried in the memorial, besides tens of thousands of Army soldiers, include 56 members of the Guardia di Finanza, 72 sailors (the crews of the submarines Medusa and Jalea, sunk in the Adriatic Sea in 1915 and salvaged in the 1950s), and one single woman, Margherita Kaiser Parodi Orlando, a volunteer nurse who died in 1918 while assisting soldiers sick with Spanish flu. The cemetery once had reliefs of Fasces at the base.

The hill opposite, the Colle di Sant'Elia, was formerly the site of the war cemetery of the Third Army. It has been turned into a memorial park, with memorial stones dedicated to the various branches of the Italian Army and the Italian Armed Forces, and to everyday objects of the soldier (from mess kits to pincers), as well as a display of Italian and Austro-Hungarian artillery pieces. A museum with war relics, reconstructions and panels about the history of the Third Army and the battles of the Isonzo is located between Monte Sei Busi and the Colle di Sant'Elia.

Italy's fallen in World War I are commemorated at Redipuglia on 4 November of every year, by the President of the Italian Senate.

See also
 The Italian Charnel House, Kobarid
 Military Memorial of Monte Grappa
 Oslavia War Memorial

References

External links
 
 Memory and the cult of the fallen (Italy)
 Fascist Italy’s Ossuaries of the First World War

World War I memorials in Italy
War cemeteries in Italy
Tourist attractions in Friuli-Venezia Giulia
Buildings and structures completed in 1938
Italian fascist architecture